Hans Fritz Köllner (23 May 1896 – 12 December 1976) was a German screenwriter. He also directed the 1946 film Allez Hopp.

Selected filmography
 A Love, A Thief, A Department Store (1928)
 The Song of the Sun (1933)
 The Double Fiance (1934)
 A Hoax (1936)
 The Empress's Favourite (1936)
 The Star of Rio (1940)
 Front Theatre (1942)
 Allez Hopp (1946)
 Hit Parade (1953)
 The Doctor's Secret (1955)
 The Star of Rio (1955)
 As Long as the Roses Bloom (1956)
 Two Hearts in May (1958)
 Arena of Fear (1959)
 My Daughter Patricia (1959)

References

Bibliography 
 Fritsche, Maria. Homemade Men In Postwar Austrian Cinema: Nationhood, Genre and Masculinity . Berghahn Books, 2013.

External links 
 

1896 births
1976 deaths
Film people from Dresden
German male screenwriters
20th-century German screenwriters